The 2022–23 National League season is the 85th season of Swiss professional ice hockey and the sixth season as the National League (NL).

With a 52-game regular season remaining intact, 14 teams were announced to be participating in the campaign, marking the return of EHC Kloten after four years, following promotion from the Swiss League. The 2022–23 NL season will also begin the new league sponsorship partnership with Yuh Financial.

In the post-season, the quarterfinals and semi-finals of the NL playoffs will be split and featured on alternative days and in the NL playout finals, four foreign player licenses will be allowed to participate on each team in the series against the playout loser and Swiss League champion.

Teams

Regular season

Standings

Statistics

Scoring leaders

The following shows the top ten players who led the league in points, at the conclusion of the regular season. If two or more skaters are tied (i.e. same number of points, goals and played games), all of the tied skaters are shown.

Leading goaltenders
The following shows the top five goaltenders who led the league in goals against average, provided that they have played at least 40% of their team's minutes, at the conclusion of the regular season.

Playoffs

Bracket

References

External links
  
 NL on eurohockey.com
 NL on eliteprospects.com

1
Swiss
National League (ice hockey) seasons